{ "type": "ExternalData", "service": "page", "title": "Western Australian region – Wheatbelt.map" }

The Wheatbelt is one of nine regions of Western Australia defined as administrative areas for the state's regional development, and a vernacular term for the area converted to agriculture during colonisation. It partially surrounds the Perth metropolitan area, extending north from Perth to the Mid West region, and east to the Goldfields–Esperance region. It is bordered to the south by the South West and Great Southern regions, and to the west by the Indian Ocean, the Perth metropolitan area, and the Peel region.

The region has 42 local government authorities, with an estimated population of 75,000 residents. The Wheatbelt accounts for approximately three per cent of Western Australia's population.

Ecosystems

The area, once a diverse ecosystem, reduced when clearing began in the 1890s with the removal of plant species such as eucalypt woodlands and mallee, is now home to around 11% of Australia's critically endangered plants.

A number of nationally threatened birds reside in the Wheatbelt, including the endangered Carnaby's black cockatoo and the vulnerable malleefowl.

The Wheatbelt encompasses a range of ecosystems and, as a result, there are a range of industries operating in the region.

In the Interim Biogeographic Regionalisation for Australia there are a number of subdivisions such as the Avon Wheatbelt (AVW), and a further breakdown of Avon Wheatbelt P1 (AW1) and Avon Wheatbelt P2 (AW2), Jarrah Forest, Geraldton Sandplains and Mallee regions.

Industry and economy
Near the coast, the region receives relatively high rainfall and mild temperatures, and its  of coastline is a significant tourist area.  In contrast, the eastern fringe is very arid, and is mainly used for pastoral farming of sheep. Mining of gold, nickel and iron ore also occurs.  The remainder of the region is highly suited to agriculture, and is the source of nearly two thirds of the state's wheat production, half of its wool production, and the majority of its lamb and mutton, oranges, honey, cut flowers and a range of other agricultural and pastoral products.

Change
With a range of climate and economic changes in the region, considerable effort is made by government at all levels to cope with the decline of some communities, and create opportunities for ventures that keep population in the region.

Transport

The Wheatbelt once had an extensive railway system, which transported bulk wheat grain. It has been reduced in part, while the main lines are being supported. Grain is transported on the those lines to ports for export from the CBH grain receival points (grain silos), which are primarily located in the Wheatbelt region.

A network of main roads connects towns within the Wheatbelt to each other, the highways, and neighbouring regions, with local roads providing additional links and access to smaller townsites. Roads are often named after the towns they connect.

Local government areas

The following list is the shires listed in the Wheatbelt as designated by the Wheatbelt Development Commission. Some shires in adjoining regions are traditionally considered part of the Wheatbelt – there are shires in the Great Southern, Goldfields-Esperance and Mid West regions that are dominantly grain growing areas. 

Beverley
Brookton
Bruce Rock
Chittering
Corrigin
Cuballing
Cunderdin
Dandaragan
Dalwallinu
Dowerin
Dumbleyung
Gingin
Goomalling
Kellerberrin
Kondinin
Koorda
Kulin
Lake Grace
Merredin
Moora
Mount Marshall
Mukinbudin
Narembeen
Narrogin
Northam
Nungarin
Pingelly
Quairading
Tammin
Toodyay
Trayning
Victoria Plains
Wagin
Wandering
West Arthur
Westonia
Wickepin
Williams
Wongan-Ballidu
Wyalkatchem
Yilgarn
York

Sub-regions within the Wheatbelt

There are numerous subdivisions of the Wheatbelt, and in most cases the separation is by local government areas.

Wheatbelt Development Commission

The Wheatbelt Development Commission (WDC) breaks the region up into five sub-regions with four offices:

 Avon
Shire of Beverley
Shire of Cunderdin
Shire of Dowerin
Shire of Goomalling
Shire of Koorda
Shire of Northam – WDC office in Northam
Shire of Quairading
Shire of Tammin
Shire of Toodyay
Shire of Wyalkatchem
Shire of York
 Central Coast, comprising:
Shire of Chittering
Shire of Dandaragan
Shire of Gingin
 Central Midlands, comprising:
Shire of Dalwallinu
Shire of Moora – WDC office in Moora
Shire of Victoria Plains
Shire of Wongan-Ballidu
 Central East
Shire of Bruce Rock
Shire of Kellerberrin
Shire of Merredin – WDC office in Merredin
Shire of Mount Marshall
Shire of Mukinbudin
Shire of Narembeen
Shire of Nungarin
Shire of Trayning
Shire of Westonia
Shire of Yilgarn
 Wheatbelt South
Shire of Brookton
Shire of Corrigin
Shire of Cuballing
Shire of Dumbleyung
Shire of Kondinin
Shire of Kulin
Shire of Lake Grace
Shire of Narrogin – WDC office in Narrogin
Shire of Pingelly
Shire of Wagin
Shire of Wandering
Shire of West Arthur
Shire of Wickepin
Shire of Williams

Tourism regions
Most of the Wheatbelt is included in the larger Australia's Golden Outback.

Due to their proximity to Perth, however, the following shires are instead promoted as part of the Destination Perth region. The tourist precincts are included:

 Avon Valley
Beverley
Brookton
Goomalling
Northam
Toodyay
Victoria Plains
York
 Peel and Rockingham
Wandering
 Sunset Coast
Gingin
 Swan Valley
Chittering

Finally, the northwestern Shire of Dandaragan is promoted as part of Australia's Coral Coast region due to the presence of the larger seaside towns of Cervantes and Jurien Bay, which developed independently of wheat-growing.

Other regional designations

The Wheatbelt is separated into other designations at various times as well:

Wheatbelt North East
Wheatbelt Central
The Open Wheatbelt

See also
 Wheatbelt (Australia)

Notes

References

Further reading

External links

 Wheatbelt Development Commission

 
Regions of Western Australia